Edoardo Gaffeo (born 12 August 1967 in Rovigo) is an Italian politician.

Gaffeo ran for Mayor of Rovigo at the 2019 Italian local elections, supported by a centre-left coalition. He was elected on 10 June and took office on 13 June 2019.

See also
2019 Italian local elections
List of mayors of Rovigo

References

External links

Politicians of Veneto
1967 births
Living people
Mayors of Rovigo
Marche Polytechnic University alumni